Swami Dhananjoy Das Kathiababa Mahavidyalaya, established in 2009, is the general degree college in Bhara village, Bankura district. It offers undergraduate courses in arts. It is affiliated to Bankura University.

Departments

Arts

Bengali
English
History
Philosophy
Sanskrit
Geography
Political Science
Music
Education

Accreditation
The college is recognized by the University Grants Commission (UGC).

See also

References

External links 
Swami Dhananjoy Das Kathiababa Mahavidyalaya

Colleges affiliated to Bankura University
Universities and colleges in Bankura district
Educational institutions established in 2009
2009 establishments in West Bengal